First West of England is a bus operator providing services in Bristol, Bath, Somerset, South Gloucestershire and Wiltshire. It is a subsidiary of FirstGroup.

History

 

In 1875 George White formed the Bristol Tramways Company and began a horse-drawn service from Upper Maudlin Street to Blackboy Hill. In 1887 the Bristol Tramways Company merged with the Bristol Cab Company to form the Bristol Tramways & Carriage Company, later the Bristol Omnibus Company.

In 1929 the White family sold out to the Great Western Railway who by 1932 had sold it to the Western National. In 1948 the company was nationalised, and in 1969 it became part of the National Bus Company.

In September 1983 the National Bus Company split the operation in two, with the Cheltenham and Gloucester Omnibus Company taking the services in Cheltenham, Gloucester, Stroud and Swindon. The remainder stayed with the existing Bristol Omnibus Company, divided into two business units: Citybus for services within Bristol, and Bristol Country Bus for services in Bath, Somerset and Wiltshire.

Badgerline was formed in 1985 as the business name of the Bristol Country Bus and in 1986 its assets were transferred to a separate legal entity and privatised in September 1986 in a management buyout.

In September 1987, City Line (formerly Citybus) was sold to Midland Red West which in April 1988 was purchased by Badgerline. After Badgerline merged with GRT Group to form FirstBus in April 1995. In 1996 Badgerline was merged back into City Line, the City Line operation was rebranded as First Bristol.

Southern National was formed in 1983 as the Somerset and Dorset operations of Western National (then part of the National Bus Company). It was privatised in 1988, acquired by FirstGroup in 1999 and rebranded as First Southern National.

In 2001 FirstGroup changed the legal structure of some of its bus operating subsidiaries. The legal entity which had been Badgerline Limited was renamed First City Line Limited and became the operator of Bristol city services (now First Bristol Limited). The legal entity which had been First Bristol Buses Limited (which had previously been Bristol Omnibus Company, incorporated in 1887) was renamed First Somerset & Avon Limited in May 2003 after merging with Somerset operations of First Southern National.

In 2013 buses started to be painted into the new First Bus livery and 'West of England' branding was applied on both sides beneath the windows (on some single-decks the branding is applied above the windows towards the front of the bus). First Somerset & Avon is still printed on some tickets, while other tickets are printed with First Bristol & Avon or just First Bristol.

In February 2014, First's Bridgwater and Taunton business was transferred to First South West and rebranded as The Buses of Somerset in an unprecedented break from the FirstGroup corporate style. The business instead now sports a two-tone green and cream livery with bespoke branding, website and social media profiles.

In December 2016 all services operated by First Bristol transferred to First Somerset & Avon, which was officially renamed First West of England in June 2017, meaning Bristol city services are once again operated by the same legal company as when they first started in 1875.

In August 2018, the Weston-super-Mare based operations were rebranded as Badgerline with the yellow and green livery of the former operator adopted.

Services
First West of England operate the majority of services in Bristol and an extensive network of services in and around Bath, Trowbridge, Wells and Weston-super-Mare.

Fleet
As of November 2018, the fleet consisted of 488 buses and coaches. The fleet includes 77 Alexander Dennis Enviro400 CNG natural gas-powered buses, which entered service in February 2020.

Depots
First West of England operate five depots: Marlborough Street, Lawrence Hill, Hengrove, Bath, Weston-super-Mare and Wells.

See also
Buses in Bristol
First South West
The Buses of Somerset

References

External links

First Somerset & Avon Flickr gallery
Flickr gallery

Bus operators in Somerset
Bus operators in Wiltshire
FirstGroup bus operators in England
Transport in South Gloucestershire District
Transport companies established in 1875
1875 establishments in England
Bus operators in Bristol